Edgar Winters Hillyer (December 3, 1830 – May 10, 1882) was a United States district judge of the United States District Court for the District of Nevada.

Education and career

Born in Granville, Ohio, Hillyer attended Denison University. He read law to enter the bar in 1856 and was in private practice in Placer County, California from 1856 to 1861. He was a lieutenant colonel in the United States Army during the American Civil War, from 1861 to 1865, and in the JAG Corps, Department of the Pacific from 1865 to 1866. He returned to private practice in Nevada starting in 1866 and was District Attorney of Storey County, Nevada from 1866 to 1869.

Federal judicial service

On December 15, 1869, Hillyer was nominated by President Ulysses S. Grant to a seat on the United States District Court for the District of Nevada vacated by Judge Alexander W. Baldwin. Hillyer was confirmed by the United States Senate on December 21, 1869. He received his commission the same day and served in that capacity until his death on May 10, 1882, in Carson City, Nevada.

References

Sources
 

Judges of the United States District Court for the District of Nevada
United States federal judges appointed by Ulysses S. Grant
19th-century American judges
United States Army colonels
1830 births
1882 deaths
United States federal judges admitted to the practice of law by reading law